Boletinellus proximus is a species of bolete fungus in the family Boletinellaceae. It is found in Florida, where it grows on the ground or rotten wood in moist habitats.

References

Fungi described in 1945
Paxillaceae
Fungi of North America